Benazir Ahmed is a retired Bangladeshi police officer who served as 30th Inspector General of Bangladesh Police. Prior to join as IGP, he served as the Director General of Rapid Action Battalion from January 2015 to April 2020. Benazir is currently on a US sanctions list due the Rapid Action Battalion's alleged role in forcibly disappearing citizens since December, 2021.

Education 
Benazir Ahmed was born in Gopalganj and studied English Literature at University of Dhaka and earned his Ph.D. in Business Administration from an American university.

Career
Ahmed joined Bangladesh Police Service as Assistant Superintendent of Police in 1988. He served in various appointments all along with his career. He has also received many professional pieces of training from home and abroad. He was deprived of promotion allegedly during the government of Bangladesh Nationalist Party as part of discrimination against police officers from Gopalganj and police officers from minority religions. He was the Commissioner of Dhaka Metropolitan Police. He criticized Transparency International Bangladesh report on Bangladesh police which he described as criticizing the Police "cruelly" and "unjustly" in 2013.

On 30 December 2014, Ahmed was appointed Director General of Rapid Action Battalion replacing Mukhlesur Rahman.

He was made the Inspector General of Bangladesh Police in April 2020.

In 2022, Home ministry issued a notice that, IGP and two other officials are going to Germany on a 9-day visit to check the quality of 100,000 pieces of bed sheet for double cot and pillows for the police department. But The news has caused stir in the social media and later the trip was cancelled after an uproar. Bangladesh Police claim that these reports were "untrue and misleading," and were a result of "linguistic confusion."

US sanctions 
On 10 December 2021, the U.S. Department of the Treasury added Ahmed to its Specially Designated Nationals (SDN) list under the Global Magnistsky Act. Individuals on the list have their assets blocked and U.S. persons are generally prohibited from dealing with them.

Ahmed denied all allegations and expressed his shock on being sanctioned. He blamed the sanctions on "propaganda" and "anti state forces." He also accused human rights organisations of misleading US politicians, specifically referring to one unnamed group whose "South Asia director" was "a Pakistani."

References

Living people
Bangladeshi police officers
Rapid Action Battalion officers
Inspectors General of Police (Bangladesh)
University of Dhaka alumni
1963 births
Specially Designated Nationals and Blocked Persons List
People sanctioned under the Magnitsky Act